Gunnislake and Calstock was an electoral division of Cornwall in the United Kingdom which returned one member to sit on Cornwall Council between 2013 and 2021. It was abolished at the 2021 local elections, being succeeded by Calstock.

Councillors

Extent
Gunnislake and Calstock represented the villages of Calstock, Dimson, Gunnislake and Drakewalls, and the hamlets of Albaston and St Ann's Chapel. It was bordered to the east by the River Tamar and to the west by the division of St Dominick, Harrowbarrow and Kelly Bray, and covered a total area of 1120 hectares.

Election results

2017 election

2013 election

References

Electoral divisions of Cornwall Council
Calstock